Gompholobium glabratum, commonly known as dainty wedge-pea, is a species of flowering plant in the family Fabaceae and is endemic to south-eastern continental Australia. It is a low-lying or ascending shrub with pinnate leaves that have five to seven leaflets, and yellow and green or greyish flowers.

Description

Taxonomy and naming
Gompholobium glabratum was first formally described in 1825 by Augustin Pyramus de Candolle in his Prodromus Systematis Naturalis Regni Vegetabilis. The specific epithet (glabratum) means "nearly glabrous".

Distribution and habitat
Dainty wedge-pea grows forest and heath on the coast and tablelands of New South Wales south from Forster to the far north-eastern corner of Victoria.

References

Mirbelioids
glabratum
Fabales of Australia
Flora of New South Wales
Flora of Victoria (Australia)
Plants described in 1825
Taxa named by Augustin Pyramus de Candolle